Mohamed Mustafa Ma al-'Aynayn (c. 1830–31 in Oualata, present-day Mauritania – 1910 in Tiznit, Morocco; complete name Mohamad Mustafa ben Mohamad Fadel Maa al-'Aynayn ash-Shanguiti ) was a Saharan Moorish religious and political leader who fought French and Spanish colonization in North Africa. He was the son of Mohammed Fadil Mamin (founder of the Fadiliyya, a Qadiriyya Sufi brotherhood), and the elder brother of shaykh Saad Bouh, a prominent marabout (religious leader) in Mauritania.

Early years
Ma al-'Aynayn was born in 1830 in the southern Hawdh region, the twelfth of 48 brothers born to the Qadiri Sufi Sheikh Muhammad Fadil. He was singled out among his brothers to study in Fes.

In 1859, Ma al-'Aynayn settled in the oasis of Tindouf in present-day Algeria. Ma al-'Aynayn was a nickname he received as a child, meaning "water of the two eyes" in Arabic, in reference to the Qadiriya Sheikh Sidi Ahmed El Bekkay who immigrated to Oualata a few centuries earlier. The son of a famous Marabout, he quickly became known as a great scholar. His nomadic encampment attracted many students of Islamic law.

In 1898, Ma al-'Aynayn began building a Ribat in Smara, in the Spanish Sahara (present-day Western Sahara). His goal in creating the Ribat, which was previously just a water center for travelers, was to launch attacks on European colonial forces and particularly the French. The Moroccan sultan Abdelaziz assisted him in building the Ribat, as he sent craftsmen, materials, financing and arms, and also appointed him Caid. In 1902, he moved there creating among other things an Islamic library.

The anticolonial revolt
Increasingly disturbed by Western penetration of the area, which he viewed both as an intrusion by hostile foreign powers and as a Christian assault on Islam, he began agitating for resistance. Local Saharan tribes performed ghazi raids against the foreign forces, but French troops drew ever closer, conquering one local ruler after another. In 1904, Ma al-'Aynayn proclaimed a holy war, or jihad, against the colonizers. He proclaimed that the trab al-beidan (a desert area that includes today's Mauritania, southern Morocco, Western Sahara and large swaths of northern Mali and southern-western Algeria) was under the Sultan's rule. Sultan Abdelaziz of Morocco did not have direct control over Ma al-'Aynayn's forces but this display of effective cooperation helped assemble a large coalition of tribes to fight the colonizers. Ma al-'Aynayn set about acquiring firearms and other materials both through channels in Morocco and through direct negotiations with rival European powers such as Germany, and quickly built up a sizable fighting force. A member of his Gudfiyya brotherhood in 1905 may have assassinated Xavier Coppolani, who was leading the French conquest of Mauritania, thereby delaying the conquest of the emirate of Adrar for a few years.

Character assassination in the press 
Sheikh Ma’ al-‘Aynayn was the target of an extensive character assassination campaign in the French arabophone newspaper Es-Saada, published out of the French Legation in Tangier. The newspaper called the qaid and spiritual leader’s patriotism and religious devotion into question, describing him as an unscrupulous mendicant and arms smuggler, even peddling rumors that his followers were Shii'a.

On Ma’ al-‘Aynayn es-Saada published:"The sheikh of the Sahara has returned to his old tricks; he stirred up memories when he, discontent with the money he made and the gifts he got passing by the coast on his return to his base, sent his son to Fes to appear before the Makhzen, appealing with his father’s readiness to protect the Makhzen and oust the French from Oujda."and:"Abdelaziz had no compassion for the sheikh, nor did he honor him for the sake of his entourage and supporters. We still remember the gifts bestowed upon him last year, and the great wrongs the day the ungrateful sheikh passed through Casablanca, and how the laborers were made to submit to him, supplicating like sheep around a shepherd while their managers jostled to bless him, bearing gifts and money. The sheikh mocks the Makhzen and laughs at it."

Literature
The Shaykh Ma al-'Aynayn was a prolific writer and left a number of works including Mubṣir al-mutashawwif ʻalá Muntakhab al-Taṣawwuf.

Defeat of Morocco and Final years
In 1906 the Sultan Abdelaziz ratified the Algeciras Conference, granting colonial powers substantial concessions over Morocco, Ma al-'Aynayn's deemed this a betrayal, and supported in 1907 the Sultan's brother and rival Abdelhafid (at the time opposed to the French). The flow of arms from the Makhzen dwindled as a result. The French forces under then-colonel Gouraud pushed forward in the French Sudan, and Ma al-'Aynayn was forced to retreated to Tiznit (Morocco) in 1908-1909 determined to fight along Abdelhafid in dethroning his brother, which they succeeded in doing.

In 1910, anarchy spread through Morocco, as the new Sultan grew ever weaker under European pressures. Ma al-'Aynayn, concerned that Morocco would fall into European hands, decided to extend Jihad north of Tiznit at the head of an army of 6,000 men to overthrow the new Sultan Abdelhafid. He was defeated by French General Moinier, on June 23, 1910. He would die several months later at Tiznit, on October 23 of the same year.

Legacy of Ma al-'Aynayn
A few years after Ma al-'Aynayn's death, his son El-Hiba, known as The Blue Sultan, continued the war against the French, but was ultimately defeated.

Ma al-'Aynayn enjoyed tremendous prestige and his name is invoked by both the Morocco and the Polisario Front.
For Moroccans, he embodied the idea of unity of Morocco and the Sahara. Many descendants of Ma al-'Aynayn hold high-profile offices in Morocco as well as in the Polisario Front and in Mauritania.

Ma al-'Aynayn, is buried in Tiznit, Morocco where his tomb became a pilgrimage site.

See also
 History of Mauritania
 History of Morocco
 History of Western Sahara
 List of tariqas
 Smara

References

 Ma al-Aynayn al-Kalkami, in : The Encyclopaedia of Islam (pp.889–892), Brill Archive, 1954

1830s births
1910 deaths
Military history of Morocco
History of Western Sahara
Moroccan Sunni Muslims
Sahrawi Sunni Muslims
Moroccan religious leaders
Sahrawi religious leaders
Year of birth unknown